Waseca is a village in the Canadian province of Saskatchewan within the Rural Municipality of Eldon No. 471 and Census Division No. 17. Waseca is located on Highway 16, the Yellowhead Highway, in northwest Saskatchewan. Waseca is located east of Lashburn and west of Maidstone.

History 
Waseca incorporated as a village on March 15, 1911. The village was probably named after Waseca, Minnesota. A former resident of the Waseca area (1923-1942) has stated she was told that Waseca was an Indigenous name meaning "looking upwards" and the name was assigned when the CN railway station was built.

Demographics 

Climate

See also

List of communities in Saskatchewan
List of rural municipalities in Saskatchewan

References

Villages in Saskatchewan
Eldon No. 471, Saskatchewan
Division No. 17, Saskatchewan